Bertram Harold Richardson (12 March 1932 – 24 September 2020) was an English cricketer who played first-class cricket for  Derbyshire from 1950 to 1953.

Richardson was born at Ashton-under-Lyne, Lancashire. He joined Derbyshire at the start of the 1950 season and went on to play in the first and second XI. He made his first-class debut against Glamorgan in June 1950 in a match which was abandoned before he had a chance to bat. He made 14 first-class appearances in 1950 and his best bowling performance was 4 for 39 against Hampshire. He played eight matches in the 1951 season and took six wickets. He played two first-class matches in the 1952 season and three in the 1953 season when he played more games for the second XI and for the Club and Ground.

Richardson was a left-hand batsman and played 36 innings in 27 first-class matches at an average of  11.16 and a top score of 29, He was a slow left-arm orthodox bowler and took 33 first-class wickets at an average of 30.39 and a best performance of 4 for 39.

References

1932 births
2020 deaths
Cricketers from Ashton-under-Lyne
Derbyshire cricketers
English cricketers